The Big Goose Creek Buffalo Jump is a buffalo jump located in rural Sheridan County, Wyoming. The site consists of the path which buffalo were driven along, the jump site, and the kill site below the cliff. It was added to the National Register of Historic Places in 1974.

References

Wyoming State Historical Preservation Office

Buffalo jumps
National Register of Historic Places in Sheridan County, Wyoming